Sumer was the first urban civilization in the historical region of southern Mesopotamia

Sumer or Sümer may also refer to:

Places

 Sumer, Bhopal, a village in India
 Sumer, Bulgaria, a village in Bulgaria
 Sumer, Sagar, a town in India
 Sumer, Vidisha, a town in India
 Sumer Hill, Texas, an unincorporated community in Henderson County, in the U.S. state of Texas

People
 Adalet Ağaoğlu (née Sümer; 1929 – 2020), Turkish Actress 
 Fahri Sümer (born 1958), Turkish boxer
 Özkan Sümer (1940 – 2020), Turkish footballer 
 Sumer Singh of Jodhpur (1898 – 1918), Maharaja of Jodhpur  
 Sumer Singh Solanki (born 1972), Indian politician 
 Sümer Tilmaç (1948 – 2015), Turkish actor

See also
Summer (disambiguation)
Sumer is icumen in, medieval English song
Sumeria (disambiguation)
Sumerian (disambiguation)